Daymé Arocena (born January 1992) is an Afro-Cuban jazz singer from Havana, who has been described as Cuba's "finest young female singer." She won the 2015 Juno Award for the best jazz album, as a member of the jazz band Maqueque performing with Canadian musician Jane Bunnett.

Arocena is on National Public Radio's (NPR) list of 50 favourite albums of 2015, with the album Nueva Era. Describing Arocena's voice, NPR host Felix Contreras called her "a cross between Celia Cruz and Aretha Franklin," saying that Arocena's name "deserve[d] to be alongside those two legendary voices."

Arocena began performing semi-professionally when she was eight years old; at the age of 14, she became the lead singer of the band Los Primos. She is considered a musical prodigy, and is a trained composer, arranger, choir director, and band leader, in addition to being a singer.

Arocena is a strong believer in Santeria, an Afro-Caribbean religion based on Yoruba principles; to mark her faith, she frequently performs wearing a turban and dressed in white.

References

Living people
Afro-Cuban jazz singers
Year of birth uncertain
Cuban Santeríans
1992 births
21st-century Cuban women  singers
Musicians from Havana